Yehuda Magidovitch (1886–1961) was one of the most prolific Israeli architects. Among his prominent works are the Galei Aviv Casino, a café-restaurant (demolished in 1939), and the Cinema Esther (now Cinema Hotel), both in Tel Aviv.

Biography

Early life
Yehuda Magidovitch was born in 1886 in Uman in the Ukraine. He studied in Odessa. In 1919, he emigrated to Mandatory Palestine.

Career
Magidovitch became the first chief engineer of Tel Aviv in 1920. In 1923 he established his own design and construction company. In 1934 his son Raphael also joined the office.

Magidovitch's 1920s buildings were in eclectic style, but beginning in the early 1930s he started moving towards Art Deco. His first International style designs from 1934 retained a personal artistic expression.

Death
Magidovitch suffered a brain hemorrhage in 1954, which brought his professional activity to an end. He died in 1961 in Tel Aviv, Israel.

Gallery

See also
White City (Tel Aviv)

References

External links

1886 births
1973 deaths
People from Uman
People from Tel Aviv
Architects in Mandatory Palestine
Israeli architects